is the twenty-eighth single of J-pop group Morning Musume and was released November 9, 2005. It peaked at #4 on the weekly Oricon chart, charting for seven weeks. The limited edition of this single came with five photo cards featuring two members on each card and came in special packaging.

History
The single's standard cover features the girls as numbers on a mobile phone keypad. The title track was originally from their sixth album Ai no Dai 6 Kan, titled "Chokkan (Toki Toshite Koi wa)". Originally, the title track was going to be the coupling track, "Koi wa Hassō Do the Hustle!", but was changed due to unpopularity during live concert performances shortly prior to the single's release. Tsunku later stated that the original song had been such a success during the group's 2005 spring tour that he also wanted to add it to the autumn tour's set-list. While watching footage of the autumn tour, which he did not attend, he came up with the lyrics to what would later become Chokkan 2, wondering if all of the excitement during the performance of the song was a "message from the fans." As well as new lyrics, the song was given an altered dance routine. Yet another remix of the song, "Chokkan 2 (Nogashita Sakana wa Ookiizo! (Mattaku Sono Toori Remix))", appeared on their seventh album Rainbow 7, released in February 2006.

Random copies of the initial pressing of the single contained a special card purchasers could fill out and send in, to try to win a limited edition poster of the member of their choice (limited to 1,000 posters of each member, a total of 10,000 posters were to be given away). In mid-December, the posters were sent to the winning entrants.

Track listing

Personnel
Hitomi Yoshizawa – minor vocals
Ai Takahashi – main vocals
Asami Konno – minor vocals
Makoto Ogawa – minor vocals
Risa Niigaki – minor vocals
Miki Fujimoto – main vocals
Eri Kamei – main vocals
Sayumi Michishige – main vocals
Reina Tanaka – main vocals
Koharu Kusumi – main vocals
Track 1
Shunsuke Suzuki (all instruments, arrangement)
Hiroshi Iida (gong, shime-daiko
Ogu (of 7House - chorus, nagado-daiko)
Tsunku (chorus)
Track 2
Shunsuke Suzuki (sitar)
Hiroshi Iida (percussion)
Hideyuki "Daichi" Suzuki (programming, guitar, arrangement)
CHNO (chorus)
Hiroaki Takeuchi (chorus)

Members at time of single 
 4th generation: Hitomi Yoshizawa
 5th generation: Ai Takahashi, Asami Konno, Makoto Ogawa, Risa Niigaki
 6th generation: Miki Fujimoto, Eri Kamei, Sayumi Michishige, Reina Tanaka
 7th generation: Koharu Kusumi

References

External links 
 Chokkan 2 (Nogashita Sakana wa Ōkiizo!) entry on the Up-Front Works official website

Morning Musume songs
Japanese-language songs
Zetima Records singles
2005 singles
Song recordings produced by Tsunku
2005 songs
Songs written by Tsunku
Dance-pop songs
Japanese synth-pop songs